Jorge Marshall Rivera (born 10 July 1954) is a Chilean politician who served as minister of State under Patricio Aylwin's government (1990–1994).

In 2021, he worked for Yasna Provoste's campaign.

References

External links
 at Annales de la República

1954 births
Living people
20th-century Chilean politicians
20th-century Chilean economists
Party for Democracy (Chile) politicians
Popular Unitary Action Movement politicians
University of Chile alumni
Harvard University alumni
People from Santiago